The  Arenys de Mar Yacht Club (CNAM) is a yacht club located in the Villa of Arenys de Mar, in the Maresme region, Barcelona. It was founded in 1952, being the fourth oldest nautical club of Catalonia, and the oldest yacht club in Spain not located in a capital of province.

Features 

Its facilities are in the Port of Arenys de Mar, where there is a "Sailing School" and a "Sport Improvement Center". Some Spanish Olympic crews have been members of this club.

One of the former presidents of the CNAM was Agustí Montal and Galobart, who was also president of FC Barcelona between 1946 and 1952. >.

The CNAM periodically organizes championships of Catalonia, Spain and even international ones of different sailing classes, especially in 420, Optimist and Laser. It also organizes national cruise regattas such as the Interclubs Zone Center Championship in February and the RANC Cup (Royal National Cruise Association) in October. CNAM's dinghies and cruising fleets are present in the main sporting events of Catalonia, Spain and Europe.

Organized Championships 

 
Especially under the presidency of Jacinto Ballester, the CNAM organized sports events of Catalonia, Spain, Europe and World's, among them.
 1970-1976: Christmas Race (Open international participation) 
  1970: Optimist World's Championship.
 1970: Spanish Championship "Open"  Flying Dutchman class.
  1970: Flying Dutchman European Championship.
 1972: Second Ladies European Sailing Championship
 Spanish Championship Dragon class
 Spanish championship Soling class

Participating VIPs 
 Juan Carlos I of Spain
 Cristina of Spain 
 Rodney Pattisson

See also 

 Maritime Museum of Barcelona
 School of pilots
 Transoceanic Pilot
 José Maria Martínez-Hidalgo

References

Bibliography 
 Ports Of Generalitat

External links 

 Web page

Yacht clubs in Spain